Plistonax is a genus of beetles in the family Cerambycidae.

Species 
Plistonax contains the following species:
 Plistonax albituberculatus Silva Junior & Souza, 2019
 Plistonax albolinitus (Bates, 1861)
 Plistonax antonkozlovi Santos-Silva, Nascimento & Silva Junior, 2020
 Plistonax ariasi (Chemsak & Hovore, 2002)
 Plistonax bialbomaculatus (Zajciw, 1964)
 Plistonax difficilis (Chemsak & Hovore, 2002)
 Plistonax hefferni (Audureau, 2017)
 Plistonax inopinatus Lane, 1960
 Plistonax pictus (Galileo & Martins, 2012)
 Plistonax rafaeli Martins & Galileo, 2006
 Plistonax senecauxi Tavakilian & Neouze, 2013
 Plistonax signatifrons (Zajciw, 1964)

References

Acanthoderini